Kevin O'Dea (born June 9, 1960) is an American football coach who most recently served as the special teams coordinator for the New Orleans Saints of the National Football League (NFL).

College career
O'Dea played wide receiver and defensive back from 1984 to 1985 at Lock Haven University.

Coaching career
O'Dea was the assistant special teams coach for the Chicago Bears from  February 14, 2006, until he was hired by the New York Jets. O'Dea was named the Jets Special Teams Coordinator on February 20, 2008 after former coordinator Mike Westhoff stepped down after seven years due to medical reasons.

Personal life
A native of State College, Pennsylvania, O'Dea spent a four-year term in the Coast Guard before enrolling at Lock Haven University. O'Dea later obtained a master's degree in education from the University of Virginia.

References

Living people
Sportspeople from Williamsport, Pennsylvania
Players of American football from Pennsylvania
Lock Haven Bald Eagles football players
Chicago Bears coaches
New York Jets coaches
Hartford Colonials coaches
1960 births